Rayan Hawili  (born November 13, 1994) is a Lebanese American football defensive back for the Saginaw Valley State football team.  He played high school football for Fordson High School in Dearborn, Michigan.

References

1994 births
Living people
Saginaw Valley State Cardinals football players